Feven Ghebremicael, best known as Feven (born 19 October 1975) is a Swedish rap artist.

In 2000, she released the music album Hela vägen ut with the charting songs "Dom tio budorden" and "Bränn BH:n". In 2001, she released the music single "Vill ha" featuring Petter. As well as the music single "It's only love".

She is a co-writer of the book Svartskallar.

On 20 February 2001, she won a Grammis award in the category Hiphop/soulalbum of the Year. Her thank you speech received plenty of attention as she heavily used American street slang.

Singles

References

Living people
1975 births
21st-century Swedish singers
21st-century Swedish women singers